Kamel Boughanem (born 16 March 1979) is a French former football player who spent his entire career in Switzerland.

References

External links

Lausanne Sport

1979 births
Living people
French expatriate footballers
French footballers
French sportspeople of Moroccan descent
FC Lugano players
FC Lausanne-Sport players
Association football forwards
Expatriate footballers in Switzerland
French expatriate sportspeople in Switzerland
Étoile Carouge FC players
FC La Chaux-de-Fonds players
Swiss Challenge League players
Place of birth missing (living people)
FC Meyrin players
FC Fribourg players